Arturo Bergamasco (born 15 March 1951) is a retired Italian rugby union footballer. He  played as an open-side flanker.

He played for Rovigo and Petrarca where he won two Italian championships. He earned his first national cap with Italy national rugby union team on 23 June 1973 against Border Bulldogs at East London.

His two sons Mirco and Mauro Bergamasco are also professional rugby players. His sons are featured on the cover of the Italian version of the EA Sports game Rugby 08.

External links
ESPN player profile

1951 births
Living people
Sportspeople from the Province of Padua
Italian rugby union players
Rugby union flankers
Italy international rugby union players